Black Ace was the most frequently used stage name of the American Texas blues musician born Babe Kyro Lemon Turner (December 21, 1905 – November 7, 1972), who was also known as B. K. Turner, Black Ace Turner, Babe Turner and Buck Turner.

He was born in Hughes Springs, Texas, and was raised on his family's farm. He taught himself to play guitar and performed in east Texas from the late 1920s on. In the early 1930s he began playing with Smokey Hogg and Oscar "Buddy" Woods, a lap steel guitarist. Turner then bought a National resonator guitar and began playing what a later music critic called "Hawaii meets the Delta."

In 1937, Turner recorded six songs (possibly with Hogg as second guitarist) for Decca Records in Dallas, including the blues song "Black Ace". In the same year, he started a radio show on KFJZ in Fort Worth, using that recording as a theme song, and soon assumed the name.

In 1941, he appeared in The Blood of Jesus, an African-American movie produced by Spencer Williams Jr. In 1943 Turner was drafted into the U.S. Army and gave up playing music for some years. In 1960, Chris Strachwitz, the owner of Arhoolie Records, persuaded him to record an album for Arhoolie.  His last public performance was in the 1962 film documentary The Blues. Turner died of cancer in Fort Worth in 1972.

Discography
 The Black Ace: BK Turner and His Steel Guitar (studio album, Arhoolie, 1960)
 I'm the Boss Card in Your Hand (compilation, Arhoolie, 1992)

References

External links
 Compilation album sleeve notes
Illustrated Black Ace discography
1960 interview with Paul Oliver

American blues singers
American blues guitarists
American male guitarists
1905 births
1972 deaths
African-American guitarists
Country blues musicians
Texas blues musicians
Decca Records artists
Deaths from cancer in Texas
20th-century American guitarists
20th-century African-American male singers
Guitarists from Texas
People from Hughes Springs, Texas
Arhoolie Records artists